Hygiene (Commerce and Offices) Convention, 1964 is  an International Labour Organization Convention.

It was established in 1964, with the preamble stating:
Having decided upon the adoption of certain proposals with regard to hygiene in commerce and offices,...

Ratifications
, the convention has been ratified by 52 states.

Provisions 
Article 14 of the convention establishes that "[s]ufficient and suitable seats shall be supplied for workers and workers shall be given reasonable opportunities of using them."

See also
Right to sit

References

External links 
Text.
Ratifications.

Occupational safety and health treaties
International Labour Organization conventions
Treaties concluded in 1964
Treaties entered into force in 1966
Hygiene
Treaties of Algeria
Treaties of Azerbaijan
Treaties of the Byelorussian Soviet Socialist Republic
Treaties of Belgium
Treaties of Bolivia
Treaties of the military dictatorship in Brazil
Treaties of the People's Republic of Bulgaria
Treaties of the Central African Republic
Treaties of Costa Rica
Treaties of Cuba
Treaties of Czechoslovakia
Treaties of the Czech Republic
Treaties of the Democratic Republic of the Congo (1964–1971)
Treaties of Denmark
Treaties of Djibouti
Treaties of Ecuador
Treaties of Finland
Treaties of France
Treaties of West Germany
Treaties of Ghana
Treaties of Guatemala
Treaties of Guinea
Treaties of Indonesia
Treaties of Italy
Treaties of Ba'athist Iraq
Treaties of Japan
Treaties of Jordan
Treaties of Kyrgyzstan
Treaties of Latvia
Treaties of Luxembourg
Treaties of Lebanon
Treaties of Madagascar
Treaties of Mexico
Treaties of Norway
Treaties of Panama
Treaties of Paraguay
Treaties of Portugal
Treaties of the Polish People's Republic
Treaties of the Soviet Union
Treaties of Saudi Arabia
Treaties of Senegal
Treaties of Slovakia
Treaties of Francoist Spain
Treaties of Sweden
Treaties of Switzerland
Treaties of Syria
Treaties of Tajikistan
Treaties of Tunisia
Treaties of the Ukrainian Soviet Socialist Republic
Treaties of the United Kingdom
Treaties of Uruguay
Treaties of Venezuela
Treaties of Vietnam
1964 in labor relations